The 1997 Chattanooga Mocs football team represented the University of Tennessee at Chattanooga as a member of the Southern Conference (SoCon) in the 1997 NCAA Division I-AA football season. The Mocs were led by fourth-year head coach Buddy Green and played first three home games at Chamberlain Field before moving to newly-opened Finley Stadium on October 18. They finished the season 7–4 overall and 4–4 in SoCon play to tie for fifth place.

Schedule

References

Chattanooga
Chattanooga Mocs football seasons
Chattanooga Mocs football